Michaël Citony (born 21 August 1980 in Villiers-le-Bel) is a French football midfielder who currently plays for R.F.C. de Liège in the Belgian Third Division.

Honours
 Ligue 2 champion in 2004 with AS Saint-Étienne
 Coupe de France runner-up in 2005 with CS Sedan-Ardennes

External links
 
 

1980 births
Living people
French footballers
French people of Martiniquais descent
AS Cannes players
Stade Rennais F.C. players
Stade Lavallois players
AS Saint-Étienne players
CS Sedan Ardennes players
US Créteil-Lusitanos players
R.W.D.M. Brussels F.C. players
AS Beauvais Oise players
Martiniquais footballers
Martinique international footballers
People from Villiers-le-Bel
Association football midfielders
Footballers from Val-d'Oise